Simona Halep was the defending champion, but chose to compete in Brisbane instead.

First-seeded Agnieszka Radwańska won the title, defeating Alison Riske in the final, 6–3, 6–2.

Seeds

Draw

Finals

Top half

Bottom half

Qualifying

Seeds

Lucky losers

Qualifying draw

First qualifier

Second qualifier

Third qualifier

Fourth qualifier

References
 Main draw
 Qualifying draw

WTA Shenzhen Open
2016 Singles